Hamu Beya – The Sand Fishers is a 2014 Malian documentary film about the Bozo people in Mali directed by Andrey Samoute Diarra. The film received the Best Documentary award alongside Portrait of a Lone Farmer at the 10th Africa Movie Academy Awards.

References

Malian documentary films
Best Documentary Africa Movie Academy Award winners
2014 films
2014 documentary films
Documentary films about race and ethnicity